Kenneth Robson Hill (20 April 1911 – 19 February 1973) was a British academic and academic administrator.

He was educated at Washington Secondary School and King's College London. He was Professor of Pathology at University College of the West Indies from 1949 to 1956. He also served as Vice-Chancellor of the University of Benin, Nigeria however his tenure was cut short because of ill health He was a member of the Athenaeum Club.

References

1911 births
1973 deaths
Alumni of King's College London
Associates of King's College London
University of the West Indies academics